Hacıahmet can refer to:

 Hacıahmet, Horasan
 Hacıahmet, Mustafakemalpaşa